Ramiro Garay (born 6 March 1997) is an Argentine professional footballer who plays as a midfielder for Primera B Nacional side Aldosivi.

Career
Garay began his career in the youth ranks of Deportivo de Castelli before joining Argentine Primera División club Aldosivi in 2016. He made his competitive Aldosivi debut on 24 February in a defeat against Estudiantes in the 2016 Argentine Primera División, during the 2016 season he was named in Aldosivi's matchday squad on five occasions but only came off the bench twice. Three appearances followed within the next two campaigns with the last ending in relegation to Primera B Nacional.

Career statistics
.

References

External links
 

1997 births
Living people
Sportspeople from Buenos Aires Province
Argentine footballers
Association football midfielders
Argentine Primera División players
Primera Nacional players
Aldosivi footballers